Abdoulaye "Diabis" Diawara (born 10 April 1981 in Abidjan) is a retired Ivorian footballer.

References

1981 births
Living people
Ivorian footballers
Ivorian expatriate footballers
K.S.K. Beveren players
Paris FC players
Expatriate footballers in Belgium
Expatriate footballers in France
Ivorian expatriate sportspeople in Belgium
Ivorian expatriate sportspeople in France
Footballers from Abidjan
Ivorian expatriates in Belgium
Association football defenders